Workhouse Theatre Company (WTC) is the only independent theatre company residing and producing in north Minneapolis. Based in the Camden neighborhoods of Minneapolis, WTC was established by Artistic Director Jeff Redman in 2004, under the name Camden Civic Theatre. The name was changed to Workhouse Theatre Company in 2006, although the theatre's dedication to Camden remains the same and WTC still maintains the title of the first and only independent theatre company based in the Camden community.

Workhouse Theatre Company is a teaching theatre whose mission is to provide the residents of the Camden neighborhoods with an opportunity to attend and to participate in quality presentations of theatrical works. In addition to offering an assortment of inexpensive classes in acting and improvisation, WTC offers a full theatrical season and regularly participates in community events such as Mississippi Heritage Day and Holiday on 44th.  Since 2006, most WTC productions have been staged at The Warren: An Artist Habitat on 44th and Osseo Road North.

Company history

October 2003: The idea for a permanent independent theatre company in the Camden community was developed and then presented at a monthly Victory Neighborhood Association meeting.
October 2004: After a year of planning and structuring, founder Jeff Redman teaches the first series of beginning theatre classes offered by Camden Civic Theatre through the format of the Minneapolis Public Schools Community Education classes held at Henry High School.
March 2006: Camden Civic Theatre becomes officially incorporated with the State of Minnesota.
August 2006: The company changes its name from the Camden Civic Theatre to the Workhouse Theatre Company.

Production history
December 2004: A Snowbound Christmas Carol (company developed)
March 2005: An Evening's Diversion (company developed)
May 2005: An Evening of Nightmares (company developed)
September 2005: Heritage Day Monologues by Valerie Borey
November 2006: The Lottery by Shirley Jackson
June 2006: The Good Doctor by Neil Simon
September 2006
The Guys by Anne Nelson
Mississippi Running by Valerie Borey
October 2006: 'night Mother by Marsha Norman
November 2006:Prometheus Bound by Aeschylus
December 2006: Scenes from A Christmas Carol by Charles Dickens, adaptation by Valerie Borey
January 2007: House by Daniel MacIvor
February 2007: Love Letters by A.R. Gurney
March 2007: No Exit by Jean Paul Sartre
June 2007: A Company of Wayward Saints by George Herman

References

External links
Workhouse Theatre Company
The Warren: An Artist Habitat

Theatre companies in Minneapolis